The Electoral district of Fingal was a single-member electoral district of the Tasmanian House of Assembly. It was located in Fingal in Tasmania's east and also included the coastal towns of St Marys and St Helens, and inland districts such as Avoca and Mathinna.

The seat was created ahead of the Assembly's first election held in 1856, and was abolished when the Tasmanian parliament adopted the Hare-Clark electoral model in 1909.

Members for Fingal

References
 
 
 Parliament of Tasmania (2006). The Parliament of Tasmania from 1956

Fingal